Burrs Mill Brook is a  tributary of Friendship Creek in southern New Jersey in the United States.

See also
List of rivers of New Jersey

References

Rivers of New Jersey
Tributaries of Rancocas Creek